William B. O'Gara (born December 6, 1931) is an American schoolteacher and politician from Maine. O'Gara, a Democrat, served in the Maine State Senate from 1996 to 2002, representing his residence in Westbrook, Maine and nearby areas of Cumberland County.

He was defeated for re-election in 2002 by Republican Carolyn Gilman. From 1974 to 1984, O'Gara served as Mayor of Westbrook.

Personal
O'Gara earned a B.A. from Springfield College (1958) and an A.A. from Portland Junior College (1955). He taught and coached at Waynflete School (Portland) and Mahoney Middle School (South Portland) from 1957 to 1980.

References

1931 births
Living people
Southern Maine Community College alumni
Mayors of Westbrook, Maine
Democratic Party Maine state senators
Schoolteachers from Maine